Getnet Wale Bayabl (born 16 July 2000) is an Ethiopian runner specialising in the 3000 metres steeplechase. He finished fourth at the 2020 Tokyo Olympics as well as at the 2019 and 2022 World Athletics Championships. Wale won the silver medal at the 2019 African Games and a bronze at the 2018 African Championships in Athletics.

He earned bronze medals at the 2016 and 2018 World Under-20 Championships. In 2019, he became the Diamond League 3000 m steeplechase champion. Wale is the current Ethiopian record holder in the indoor 3000 metres.

Early life
Getnet Wale was born one of eight children in Sekele, Ethiopia. He ran 4 km to and from school. After winning provincial titles at the 1500 metres and 3000 metres aged 13 steeplechase coach Teshome Kebede was interested in him and invited Wale to Addis Ababa.

Early running career
Wale's first international competition came at the 2016 IAAF World Under-20 Championships in Bydgoszcz, Poland. Despite falling twice at the water jump he earned the bronze medal in the 3000 m steeplechase by placing third in 8:22.83.

In 2017, Wale competed at the 2017 World Championships in Athletics making the final and placing ninth in 8:25.28.

The next year, he competed at the 2018 IAAF World U20 Championships in Tampere, Finland, where he took bronze in 8:26.16.

In 2019, Wale contested nine 3000 m steeplechase races including Diamond League wins in Rabat and Brussels. At the 2019 World Championships in Athletics, he placed fourth in the 3000 m steeplechase event in a personal best time of 8:05.21.

In 2020, Wale only raced one steeplechase after an indoor track season. He competed at the Monaco Diamond League finishing 10th in 8:35.85.

Possible transition to 5000m
On 16 January 2021, Wale placed second at the Olympic candidate trial competition in Addis Ababa. On 9 February, he ran a 7:24.98 in the 3000 metres in Liévin, France, which was the second fastest all-time indoor time for the event, behind Daniel Komen's 7:24.90 from 1998. On 11 April, he won the Ethiopian Championships over the 5000 metres. On 19 May, Wale won the 3000 m steeplechase at the 60th Ostrava Golden Spike in 8:09.47. At the Ethiopian Trials on 8 June in Hengelo, Netherlands, he won the 5000 m with a time of 12:53.28. Wale was named for the Ethiopian Olympic Team in the 5000 m for the delayed 2020 Tokyo Olympics, where he was eliminated in the heats.

International competitions

Circuit wins and titles
 Diamond League champion 3000 m steeplechase:  2019
 3000 metres steeplechase wins, other events specified in parenthesis
 2019: Rabat Meeting, Brussels Memorial Van Damme

National championships
 Ethiopian Athletics Championships
 3000 metres steeplechase: 2018, 2019
 5000 metres: 2021

Personal bests
 1500 metres indoor – 3:35.54 (Val-de-Reuil 2021)
 2000 metres –	4:58.26 (Bydgoszcz 2020)
 3000 metres indoor – 7:24.98 (Liévin 2021) 
 5000 metres – 12:53.28 (Hengelo 2021)
 3000 metres steeplechase – 8:05.21 (Doha 2019)

References

External links

 

2000 births
Living people
Ethiopian male steeplechase runners
World Athletics Championships athletes for Ethiopia
Diamond League winners
Athletes (track and field) at the 2019 African Games
African Games competitors for Ethiopia
Ethiopian Athletics Championships winners
Athletes (track and field) at the 2020 Summer Olympics
African Games medalists in athletics (track and field)
African Games silver medalists for Ethiopia
Olympic athletes of Ethiopia
21st-century Ethiopian people